Grease Gun Brothers is a 1985 Philippine action film directed by Tony Y. Reyes. The film stars Dante Varona, Bembol Roco, Rey Malonzo and Roy Flores as the title roles.

Part of the footage from the movie is featured in the 1991 movie The Fighter, the Winner.

Cast
 Dante Varona as Ramon Sanchez
 Bembol Roco as Romeo Sanchez
 Rey Malonzo as Rodrigo Sanchez
 Roy Flores as Renato Sanchez
 Michael de Mesa as Buddy Corsican
 Mark Gil as Danny Corsican
 Roi Vinzon as Sonny Corsican
 Melissa Mendez as Emily
 Kristel Romero as Gelene
 Faila Nazul as Rebecca
 Grego Gavino as Totoy Pilay
 Rene Jose as Atty. Jose
 Ernie Ortega as Antero
 Arnold Mendoza as Capt. Mallari
 Renato del Prado as Natong Burubot
 Rommel Valdez as Sendong Gilagid
 Danny Rojo as Domeng Solis
 Fred Moro as Inggong Pato
 Pong Pong as Tonyo

References

External links

1985 films
Filipino-language films
Philippine action films
Films directed by Tony Y. Reyes